GM introduced its new E-Turbo engines in the 2019 Korean-market Chevrolet Malibu. The engine is a member of GM's next generation turbocharged engine family. The engine features start-stop technology, gasoline direct injection, an electric water pump and electric turbocharger wastegate to optimize fuel efficiency.

It is also known as Eighth Generation Ecotec.

Applications

 2018–present Chevrolet Orlando (China)
 2018–present Buick Excelle
 2019–2022 Chevrolet Malibu (South Korea)
 2020–present Buick Encore GX
 2020–present Chevrolet Trailblazer
 2020–2021 Buick Verano
 2019–2022 Opel Astra/Vauxhall Astra
 2019–present Chevrolet Tracker
 2020–present Buick Lacrosse
 Chevrolet Monza (China)
 Chevrolet Onix

References

General Motors engines
Chevrolet engines
Buick engines
Straight-three engines
Gasoline engines by model